Miss Acre is a Brazilian Beauty pageant which selects the representative for the State of Acre at the Miss Brazil contest. The pageant was created in 1956 and has been held every year since with the exception of 1957, 1960-1962, 1990, 1993, and 2020. The pageant is held annually with representation of several municipalities. Since 2005, the State director of Miss Acre is, Ana Meire Lima, better known by her nickname "Meyre Manaus". Acre still has yet to win any crowns in the national contest

Results Summary

Placements
Miss Brazil: 
1st Runner-Up: Maria Cláudia Barreto (2006)
2nd Runner-Up: Danielle Knidel (2011)
3rd Runner-Up: 
4th Runner-Up: Alessandra Costa Couto (1998)
Top 5/Top 8/Top 9: 
Top 10/Top 11/Top 12: Rosângela Terezinha Michels (1982); Leila dos Santos Gomes (1997); Kailane Amorim (2017)
Top 15/Top 16: Iasmyne Sampaio (2014)

Special Awards
Miss Congeniality: 
Best State Costume:

Titleholders

Table Notes

References

External links
Official Miss Brasil Website

Women in Brazil
Acre
Miss Brazil state pageants